CBVX-FM is a Canadian radio station, which broadcasts Radio-Canada's Ici Musique network at 95.3 FM in Quebec City. The Class-C station broadcasts at 64.6 kilowatts from a transmitter at Mount Bélair.

Transmitters

References

External links
 

BVX
BVX
BVX
Year of establishment missing